The Wuxi Museum is a museum in Wuxi, Jiangsu, China. Its exhibits date back 6000 years and it has a notable collection of Qing dynasty cannons.

See also

 List of tourist attractions in China

References

Museums in Jiangsu
Buildings and structures in Wuxi